The 2015 Russian Cup was held in Penza, Russia from September 16 - 20, 2015. The competition served as a test event for the gymnasts that want to compete at the 2015 World Championships.

Medal winners

Men's results

Team competition

Individual all-around

Floor

Pommel horse

Rings

Vault

Parallel bars

Horizontal bar

Women's results

Team competition

Individual all-around 

 Angelina Melnikova, Daria Skrypnik and Natalia Kapitonova competed as guests due to their junior status.

Vault

Uneven bars 

Viktoria Komova failed to qualify for the final, but competed an exhibition routine.

Balance beam 

Seda Tutkhalyan failed to qualify for the final, but competed an exhibition routine.

Floor 

Evgeniya Shelgunova failed to qualify for the final, but competed an exhibition routine.

World championship teams 
After the competition, provisional teams were announced for the 2015 World Championships.
 Women: Ksenia Afanasyeva, Daria Spiridonova, Seda Tutkhalyan, Maria Kharenkova, Viktoria Komova, Maria Paseka
 Men: Nikita Ignatyev, David Belyavskiy, Nikolai Kuksenkov, Denis Ablyazin, Nikita Nagornyy, Alexei Rostov or Mikhail Kudashov will be the final gymnast
Most notably missing is 2010, 2013, and 2014 World Championship team member, Aliya Mustafina, who will not be competing due to back pain.

References

Cup of Russia in artistic gymnastics
2015 in gymnastics
Russian Cup